Lewis Carroll’s 1871 novel Through the Looking-Glass and What Alice Found There has been translated into 65 languages. Some of the translations, with the first date of publishing and of reprints or re-editions by other publishers, are:

See also

Translations of ''Alice's Adventures in Wonderland

References

Alice's Adventures in Wonderland
Through the Looking-Glass
Lists of fantasy books
Children's literature bibliographies